The International School of Information Science (ISIS) in Alexandria, Egypt was founded to initiate, develop, carry out, and promote research and development of activities and projects related to building a universal digital library. ISIS was also created in order to maximize creativity and foster innovations within the Bibliotheca Alexandrina. The Institute develops IT projects that will ultimately contribute to the knowledge capacity of Egypt and the world.

References 
 Arseneault, Michel.  "Alexandria, from papyrus to the Internet."  The UNESCO Courier 52, no. 4 (April 1999):  40–42.     
 Bilboul, Roger.  "The Library of Alexandria Reopens."  Information Today 19, no. 11 (December 2002): 26.   
 Watson, Bruce.  "Rising Sun." Smithsonian, April 2002.

External links 
 Official ISIS website

Education in Egypt
Science and technology in Egypt
Scientific organisations based in Egypt
Information schools